The NER 1463 Class (LNER Class E5) was a class of  steam locomotive of the North Eastern Railway. The class was designed in 1884 by a locomotive committee, chaired by Henry Tennant, and built in 1885.

Preservation
 Number 1463 is preserved at Darlington Railway Centre and Museum.

See also
 Locomotives of the London and North Eastern Railway

References

1463
2-4-0 locomotives
Railway locomotives introduced in 1885

Passenger locomotives